The following is a list of notable deaths in October 2003.

Entries for each day are listed alphabetically by surname. A typical entry lists information in the following sequence:
 Name, age, country of citizenship at birth, subsequent country of citizenship (if applicable), reason for notability, cause of death (if known), and reference.

October 2003

1
John Brim, 81, American Chicago blues musician, heart cancer.
Hardiman Cureton, 69, American football player.
Lillian DeCambra, 77, American baseball player (AAGPBL)
Huntington Hardisty, 74, U.S. Navy admiral.
Joy N. Houck Jr., 61, American actor, screenwriter and film director.
Khalid Masud, 67, Pakistani muslim scholar.
Frank Taylor, 95, British politician, MP for Manchester Moss Side.

2
Milan Bjegojević, 75, Serbian basketball player and coach.
John Thomas Dunlop, 89, American administrator and Secretary of Labor under Gerald Ford.
Otto Günsche, 86, German SS escort of Adolf Hitler, who was tasked to cremate his body on 30 April 1945, heart failure.
Ahmed Khadr, 55, Egyptian-Canadian Islamist.
Hasan Mahsum, Turkestani Islamic extremist group leader, shot by the Pakistani Army.
Denis Moore, 93, English cricketer.

3
John Baldock, 87, British politician (Member of Parliament for Harborough).
Lyall Barry, 77, New Zealand competitive swimmer.
Greg Biagini, 51, American minor league baseball player and manager, and MLB hitting coach (Baltimore Orioles).
Tish Daija, 78, Albanian composer.
Edward Hartman, 39, American convicted murderer.
Florence Stanley, 79, American voice actress.
William Steig, 95, American cartoonist and children's author; creator of Shrek.
Winifred Watkins, 79, British biochemist.

4
Athar Ali, 40, Pakistani rocket scientist, murdered.
Bill Cayton, 85, American boxing manager, former manager of Edwin Rosario and Mike Tyson.
John Horace Ragnar Colvin, 81, British intelligence officer.
Mary Donaldson, Baroness Donaldson of Lymington, 82, first female Lord Mayor of London.
Sid McMath, 91, American attorney and politician, 34th governor of Arkansas.
Elisabeta Rizea, 91, Romanian anti-communist partisan, viral pneumonia.

5
Wil van Beveren, 91, Dutch sprinter (1936 Summer Olympics: men's 100m, men's 200m, men's 4x100m relay).
Neil Postman, 72, American media critic.
Elena Slough, 114, oldest recognized person in the United States.
Denis Quilley, 75, British actor.
Dan Snyder, 25, Canadian professional ice hockey player (Atlanta Thrashers).
Timothy Treadwell, 46, American environmentalist and documentary filmmaker.
Dwain Weston, 30, Australian skydiver and base jumper.

6
Mary Christine Tan, 72, Filipino missionary, nun, and activist.
Joe Baker, 63, English footballer.
Sir Antony Buck, 74, British politician (Member of Parliament for Colchester, Colchester North).
Sir Michael Livesay, 67, British admiral, Second Sea Lord.
Charles Millot, 81, Yugoslav-French actor.
Mary Christine Tan, 72, Filipino missionary, nun, and activist.

7
Izzy Asper, 71, Canadian tax lawyer and media magnate (CanWest Global Communications Corp).
Arthur Berger, 91, American composer, music critic, teacher and an academic music writer.
Dame Felicitas Corrigan, 95, Benedictine nun.
Ryan Halligan, 13, American suicide victim.
Eleanor Lambert, 100, United States fashion pioneer.

8
Juan Armenteros, 84, Cuban-American Negro league baseball player, played in the 1953 East-West All-Star Game.
David Margolis, American mural artist.
Cyril May, 82, British politician.
Petter Thomassen, 62, Norwegian politician.
Junior Wren, 73, American professional football player (Missouri, Cleveland Browns, Pittsburgh Steelers).

9
Carolyn Gold Heilbrun, 77, American academic.
Mervyn Blake, 95, Canadian stage actor, performed at the Stratford Festival of Canada for 42 seasons.
Adolphe Deledda, 84, Italian professional cyclist.
Carl Fontana, 75, American jazz trombonist.
Tommy Hanlon Jr., 80, American-Australian actor, comedian, television host and  circus ringmaster, cancer.
Carolyn Gold Heilbrun, 77, American academic and author.
Alexei Sidorov, 31, Russian journalist and editor, stabbed.

10
Viola Burnham, 72, Guyanese politician, First Lady (Prime Minister/President Forbes Burnham) and Vice President.
Eugene Istomin, 77, American pianist.
Johnny Klippstein, 75, American baseball player (Chicago Cubs, Cincinnati Redlegs, Minnesota Twins).
Eve Newman, 88, American music and film editor (Academy Award nominations: Wild in the Streets, Two-Minute Warning).
Max Rayne, Baron Rayne, 85, British property developer and philanthropist.
Julia Trevelyan Oman, 73, British set designer.

11
Vivien Alcock, 79, English children's book writer, television adaptation of novel: Haunting of Cassie Palmer.
William J. Dorgan, 81, American Party politician.
Ivan A. Getting, 91, American physicist and electrical engineer.
Wally Nanayakkara, 64, Sri Lankan actor.
Franklyn Perring, 76, British naturalist and botanist.
Mu Qing, 82, Chinese journalist and politician, lung cancer.
Lila Ram, 72, Indian wrestler.
Siegfried Schmutzler, 88, German Evangelical Lutheran pastor.

12
J. B. Banks, 79, American politician (Missouri House of Rep., Missouri Senate, Missouri Senate Majority Leader).
Jim Cairns, 89, Australian politician (Deputy Prime Minister, Treasurer of Australia).
Joan Gadsdon, 80, Australian ballet dancer, actor and artist.
Ram Gopal, 90, Indian dancer and choreographer.
Fathur Rahman al-Ghozi, 32, Indonesian Islamic terrorist and bomb-maker, shot by police.
Ion Ioanid, 77, Romanian dissident and writer.
Joan B. Kroc, 75, philanthropist; widow of McDonald's founder Ray Kroc, brain cancer.
Pete Morisi, 75, American comic book writer and artist.
Willie Shoemaker, 72, American Hall of Fame jockey, rode the winners in eleven Triple Crown races.

13
Butch Brickell, 46, American race car driver (24 Hours of Daytona) and stuntman (The Specialist, 2 Fast 2 Furious).
Bertram Brockhouse, 85, Canadian physicist, 1994 Nobel Prize winner in physics for the development of neutron spectroscopy.
Gjorgji Kolozov, 55, Macedonian actor.
Theodore P. Mansour, 77, American politician.
Laurence Ryan, 72, Irish bishop and theologian.
Anne Ziegler, 93, English singer, known for her duets with her husband Webster Booth.

14
Fqih Basri, 75-76, Moroccan activist and opposition leader.
Ned Breathitt, 78, American politician, 51st governor of Kentucky from 1963 to 1967, ventricular fibrillation.
Findley Burns Jr., 86, American Foreign Service officer, ambassador (Jordan, Ecuador) and U.N. employee.
Wil Culmer, 45, Bahamian baseball player (Cleveland Indians).
Patrick Dalzel-Job, 90, British naval intelligence officer and commando.
Ben Metcalfe, 83, Greenpeace activist and co-founder, heart attack.
Moktar Ould Daddah, 78, former president of Mauritania.
William Redd, 91, American businessman and philanthropist.
Frances Watt, 81, Scottish singer.

15
Pierre Chanal, 56, Egyptian-French soldier and suspected serial killer, suicide.
Norman Elder, 64, Canadian writer, artist, and Olympic equestrian., suicide.
Said Fayad, 82, Lebanese poet and literary journalist.
Ray Kuhlman, 84, American pilot and businessman.
Benny Lévy, 58, Egyptian-French philosopher, political activist and author.
Arthur E. Martell, 86, American chemist.

16
Avni Arbas, Turkish artist, cancer.
Lee Bailey, 76, American author and expert on cooking and entertaining.
Don Evans, 65, American playwright, theater director, and actor, heart attack.
Stu Hart, 88, Canadian wrestler; patriarch of Hart wrestling.
László Papp, 77, Hungarian boxer.
Carl Urbano, 93, American animator and director.

17
Charlie Justice, 79, American gridiron football player (Washington Redskins).
Billy Hughes, 74, Scottish footballer.
Frank O'Flynn, 84, New Zealand politician.
Janice Rule, 72, American actress.
Clare Venables, 60, English theatre director, director of education at the Royal Shakespeare Company.

18
Joseph R. Applegate, 77, American linguistics expert, professor of African studies and a specialist in the Berber languages.
Leslie James Bennett, 82/83, British/Canadian counter-intelligence officer.
William C. Cramer, 81, American attorney and politician, heart attack
Preston Smith, 91, American politician (40th Governor of Texas from 1969 to 1973).
Manuel Vázquez Montalbán, 64, Spanish novelist (Detective Carvalho saga), journalist and poet.
R. V. Vernède, 97, British writer and colonial administrator.

19
Jaime Allende, 79, Spanish field hockey player (field hockey at the 1948 Summer Olympics).
Sir Peter Berger, 78, British admiral (Amethyst Incident).
Michael Hegstrand, 45, "Road Warrior Hawk".
Alija Izetbegović, 78, Chairman of the Presidency of Bosnia and Herzegovina.
Margaret Murie, 101, "Mother of the Modern Conservationist Movement".
Georgi Vladimov, 72, Soviet (Ukrainian) dissident writer.

20
František Balvín, 88, Czechoslovak cross-country skier (Olympic skiing: 1948 50km, 1948 relay, 1952 50km).
Ernie Calverley, 79, American professional basketball player (Rhode Island, Providence Steamrollers) and coach.
Miodrag Petrović Čkalja, 79, Serbian actor.
Jack Elam, 84, American actor.
Luis A. Ferré, 99, Puerto Rican industrialist and politician.
Peter Morgan, 83, British sports car manufacturer.

21
John Walter Baxter, 86, British civil engineer, designer of west London's Westway.
Bob Beckus, 83, American triple jumper (men's triple jump at the 1948 Summer Olympics).
Fred Berry, 52, American actor, known for his role of "Rerun" on the show What's Happening!!.
Louise Day Hicks, 87, American politician (Boston City Council, U.S. Representative for Massachusetts's 9th congress. dist.).
Elliott Smith, 34, American musician.

22
Dee Andros, 79, American football player, coach (University of Idaho, Oregon State University) and athletic director.
Derya Arbaş, 35, Turkish American actress, heart attack.
Ron Collier, 73, Canadian jazz trombonist, composer, and arranger.
Miguel Ángel Burelli Rivas, 81, Venezuelan diplomat (Ambassador to the U.S., Foreign Minister of Venezuela).
Tony Renna, 26, American motor racer and IndyCar driver, killed in an accident during a tire test.

23
Tony Capstick, 59, British actor, comedian, musician and broadcaster.
Pete Chisman, 63, British cyclist, complications from surgery.
Al Corwin, 76, American baseball player (New York Giants).
Madame Chiang Kai-shek, 105, widow of the Nationalist Chinese president Chiang Kai-shek.
Judah Segal, 91, British linguist.

24
József Apró, 82, Hungarian middle-distance runner (men's 3000 metres steeplechase at the 1952 Summer Olympics).
Bob Bailey, 72, Canadian ice hockey player (Toronto Maple Leafs, Detroit Red Wings, Chicago Blackhawks).
Scott Bauer, 49, American senior pastor (The Church On The Way), radio program host and author.
Veikko Hakulinen, 78, Finnish cross-country skier, triple Olympic- and world champion.
Rosie Nix Adams, 45, American singer and songwriter, daughter of June Carter Cash.
Peter Sykes, 80, British chemist.

25
Hemu Adhikari, 84, Indian cricketer.
Pandurang Shastri Athavale, 83, Indian philosopher and social activist.
Noreen Branson, 93, British political activist and historian of the Communist Party of Great Britain.
John Hart Ely, 64, American legal scholar.
Behram Kurşunoğlu, 81, Turkish physicist.

26
Steve Death, 54, English football goalkeeper, cancer.
Emory Ellis, 96, American biochemist.
Leonid Filatov, 56, Soviet and Russian actor, director and poet.
Hans-Joachim Jabs, 85, German Luftwaffe officer in World War II.
Elem Klimov, 70, Soviet Russian film director, brain hypoxia.
Alec Linwood, 83, Scottish football player.
Arthur McIntyre, 57, Australian artist and art critic.
Viguen, 73, Iranian pop music singer ("Sultan of pop") and actor.

27
Hank Beenders, 87, Dutch-American professional basketball player (Providence Steamrollers, Philadelphia Warriors, Boston Celtics).
Johnny Boyd, 77, American racecar driver, twelve Indianapolis 500-mile races from 1955 to 1966.
Pete Gudauskas, 87, American professional football player (Murray State, Cleveland Rams, Chicago Bears).
Manoj Khanderia, 60, Indian poet writer.
Virginia Lanier, 72, American writer and author.
Elisabeth Lambert Ortiz, 88, British food writer.
Rod Roddy, 66, American radio and television announcer.
Walter Washington, 88, American civil servant and politician, first Mayor of the District of Columbia.
Buzz Westfall, 59, American lawyer and politician (St. Louis County Executive), meningitis staph infection.
Fred Whittingham, 64, American professional football player (Philadelphia Eagles, New Orleans Saints), complications from back surgery.

28
Sally Baldwin, 62, British social scientist.
Ruth Batson, 82, American educator and civil rights activist, an outspoken advocate of equal education.
Jean Carbonnier, 95, French jurist.
Marie Maynard Daly, 82, American biochemist.
Edward Hartwig, 94, Polish photographer.
Joan Perucho, 82, Spanish novelist, poet and art critic, and judge.
Alexander Raichev, 81, Bulgarian composer.
Oliver Sain, 71, American musician and record producer, cancer.
Walter Trohan, 100, 20th-century American journalist (Chicago Tribune).

29
Hal Clement, 81, American author.
Gerrie Deijkers, 56, Dutch football player, heart attack.
A. Carl Helmholz, 88, American nuclear physicist.

30
Lynn S. Beedle, 85, American structural engineer, founder of the Council on Tall Buildings and Urban Habitat.
Carl Berner, 90, Danish rower (men's coxed pairs, men's eights at the 1936 Summer Olympics).
Franco Bonisolli, 65, Italian operatic tenor.
Franco Corelli, 81, operatic tenor.
Lillian Jackson, 84, American baseball player (AAGPBL).
John M. Lovett, 60, Australian government officer and former President of the ICSD.
Gil Nickel, 64, American Napa Valley vintner.
Richard Taylor, 83, American philosopher.
Mike Yaconelli, 61, American youth minister, magazine editor (The Door) and writer, co-founder of Youth Specialties.

31
Robert Guenette, 68, American film/television producer, screenwriter, and film/television director, brain tumor.
Daphne Hardy Henrion, 86, British sculptor.
Semmangudi Srinivasa Iyer, 95, Indian Classical (Carnatic) musician.
José Juncosa, 81, Spanish football player and manager.
Richard Neustadt, 84, American professor, a leading presidential scholar and an advisor to several presidents.
A. S. Rao, 89, Indian scientist.
Yechiel Shemi, Israeli sculptor.
Lindsay Weir, 95, New Zealand cricketer.

References 

2003-10
 10